Kushk (also Romanized as Kūshk; also known as Kūshk-e Marv Dasht and Kushk Marvdasht) is a village in Kenareh Rural District, in the Central District of Marvdasht County, Fars Province, Iran. At the 2006 census, its population was 3,035, in 737 families.

References 

Populated places in Marvdasht County